Mona Oikawa is a Canadian writer and professor.

Publications 
All Names Spoken, with Tamai Kobayashi, Sister Vision Press, 1992
Out Rage: Dykes and Bis Resist Homophobia, with Rosamund Elwin, Women's Press, 1993
Cartographies of Violence: Japanese Canadian Women, Memory, and the Subjects of the Internment, University of Toronto Press, 2012

References

Canadian women non-fiction writers
Living people
20th-century Canadian non-fiction writers
20th-century Canadian women writers
21st-century Canadian non-fiction writers
21st-century Canadian women writers
Canadian lesbian writers
Canadian writers of Asian descent
Year of birth missing (living people)
21st-century Canadian LGBT people
20th-century Canadian LGBT people